Gerd Larsen (born 8 September 1942) is a Danish middle-distance runner. He competed in the men's 800 metres at the 1968 Summer Olympics.

References

1942 births
Living people
Athletes (track and field) at the 1968 Summer Olympics
Athletes (track and field) at the 1972 Summer Olympics
Danish male middle-distance runners
Olympic athletes of Denmark
Place of birth missing (living people)
20th-century Danish people